The spot-tailed warty newt (Paramesotriton caudopunctatus) is a species of salamander in the family Salamandridae only found in central China. Its natural habitats are subtropical or tropical moist lowland forests and rivers. It is threatened by habitat loss.

References 

Paramesotriton
Endemic fauna of China
Amphibians of China
Taxonomy articles created by Polbot
Amphibians described in 1973